Sedna (minor-planet designation 90377 Sedna) is a dwarf planet in the outermost reaches of the Solar System discovered in 2003. Spectroscopy has revealed that Sedna's surface composition is largely a mixture of water, methane, and nitrogen ices with tholins, similar to those of some other trans-Neptunian objects. Its surface is one of the reddest among Solar System objects. It has a diameter of approximately 1,000 km (most likely between the sizes of the asteroid Ceres and Saturn's moon Tethys), with an unknown mass.

Sedna's orbit is one of the largest in the Solar System other than those of long-period comets, with its aphelion (farthest distance from the Sun) estimated at 937 astronomical units (AU). This is 31 times Neptune's distance from the Sun, and well beyond the closest portion of the heliopause, which defines the outer boundary of interplanetary space. An exploratory fly-by mission to Sedna at perihelion could be completed in 24.5 years using a Jupiter gravity assist.

Sedna has an exceptionally elongated orbit, and takes approximately 11,400 years to return to its closest approach to the Sun at a distant 76 AU. The IAU initially considered Sedna a member of the scattered disc, a group of objects sent into highly elongated orbits by the gravitational influence of Neptune. However, several astronomers contested this classification, because its perihelion is too large for it to have been scattered by any of the known planets. This has led some astronomers to informally refer to it as the first known member of the inner Oort cloud. It is the prototype of a new orbital class of object, the sednoids, which include  and Leleākūhonua.

Astronomer Michael E. Brown, co-discoverer of Sedna, believes that understanding Sedna's unusual orbit could yield information about the origin and early evolution of the Solar System.
It might have been perturbed into its orbit by a one or more stars within the Sun's birth cluster, or possibly it was captured from the planetary system of another star. The clustering of the orbits of Sedna and similar objects is speculated to be evidence for a planet beyond the orbit of Neptune.

History

Discovery 
Sedna (provisionally designated ) was discovered by Michael Brown (Caltech), Chad Trujillo (Gemini Observatory), and David Rabinowitz (Yale University) on 14 November 2003. The discovery formed part of a survey begun in 2001 with the Samuel Oschin telescope at Palomar Observatory near San Diego, California, using Yale's 160-megapixel Palomar Quest camera. On that day, an object was observed to move by 4.6 arcseconds over 3.1 hours relative to stars, which indicated that its distance was about 100 AU. Follow-up observations were made in November–December 2003 with the SMARTS (Small and Medium Research Telescope System) at Cerro Tololo Inter-American Observatory in Chile, the Tenagra IV telescope in Nogales, Arizona, and the Keck Observatory on Mauna Kea in Hawaii. Combined with precovery observations taken at the Samuel Oschin telescope in August 2003, and by the Near-Earth Asteroid Tracking consortium in 2001–2002, these observations allowed accurate determination of its orbit. The calculations showed that the object was moving along a distant highly eccentric orbit, at a distance of 90.3 AU from the Sun. Precovery images have since been found in the Palomar Digitized Sky Survey dating back to 25 September 1990.

Naming 
Brown initially nicknamed Sedna "The Flying Dutchman", or "Dutch", after a legendary ghost ship, because its slow movement had initially masked its presence from his team. He eventually settled on the official name after the goddess Sedna from Inuit mythology, partly because he mistakenly thought the Inuit were the closest polar culture to his home in Pasadena, and partly because the name, unlike Quaoar, would be easily pronounceable by English speakers. Brown further justified this naming by stating that the goddess Sedna's traditional location at the bottom of the Arctic Ocean reflected Sedna's large distance from the Sun. He suggested to the International Astronomical Union's (IAU) Minor Planet Center that any future objects discovered in Sedna's orbital region should be named after entities in Arctic mythologies.

The team made the name "Sedna" public before the object had been officially numbered, which spurred some controversy among the community of amateur astronomers. Brian Marsden, the head of the Minor Planet Center, stated that such an action was a violation of protocol, and that some members of the IAU might vote against it. Despite the complaints, no objection was raised to the name, and no competing names were suggested. The IAU's Committee on Small Body Nomenclature accepted the name in September 2004, and considered that, in similar cases of extraordinary interest, it might in the future allow names to be announced before they were officially numbered.

Sedna has no symbol in the astronomical literature, as planetary symbols are no longer much used in astronomy. Unicode contains a Sedna symbol  (U+2BF2), but this is mostly used among astrologers. The symbol is a monogram of  Sanna, the modern pronunciation of Sedna's name.

Orbit and rotation 

Sedna has the second longest orbital period of any known object in the Solar System of comparable size or larger (after Leleākūhonua), calculated at around 11,400 years. Its orbit is extremely eccentric, with an aphelion estimated at 937 AU and a perihelion at about 76 AU. This perihelion was the largest for any known Solar System object until the discovery of 2012 VP113. At its aphelion, Sedna orbits the Sun at a mere 1.3% of Earth's orbital speed.

When Sedna was discovered it was 89.6 AU from the Sun approaching perihelion, and was the most distant object in the Solar System observed. Sedna was later surpassed by Eris, which was detected by the same survey near aphelion at 97 AU. The orbits of some long-period comets extend further than that of Sedna; they are too dim to be discovered except when approaching perihelion in the inner Solar System. As Sedna nears its perihelion in mid-2076, the Sun will appear merely as an extremely bright star-like pinpoint in its sky, too far away to be visible as a disc to the naked eye.

When first discovered, Sedna was thought to have an unusually long rotational period (20 to 50 days). It was initially speculated that Sedna's rotation was slowed by the gravitational pull of a large binary companion, similar to Pluto's moon Charon. However, a search for such a satellite by the Hubble Space Telescope in March 2004 found nothing. Subsequent measurements from the MMT telescope showed that Sedna actually has a much shorter rotation period of about 10 hours, more typical for a body of its size. It could rotate in about 18 hours instead, but this is thought to be unlikely.

Physical characteristics 

Sedna has a V band absolute magnitude of about 1.8, and it is estimated to have an albedo of about 0.32, giving it a diameter of approximately 1,000 km. At the time of its discovery it was the brightest object found in the Solar System since Pluto in 1930. In 2004, the discoverers placed an upper limit of 1,800 km on its diameter; after observation by the Spitzer Space Telescope, this was revised downward by 2007 to less than 1,600 km. The size of this object suggests it could have undergone differentiation and may have a sub-surface liquid ocean and possibly geologic activity.

Because Sedna has no known moons, directly determining its mass is impossible without sending a space probe or locating a nearby perturbing object. Sedna is the largest trans-Neptunian Sun-orbiting object not known to have a satellite. Observations from the Hubble Space Telescope in 2004 were the only published attempt to find a satellite, and it is possible that a satellite could have been lost in glare from Sedna itself.

Observations from the SMARTS telescope show that in visible light Sedna is one of the reddest objects in the Solar System, nearly as red as Mars. Chad Trujillo and his colleagues suggest that Sedna's dark red color is caused by a surface coating of hydrocarbon sludge, or tholin, formed from simpler organic compounds after long exposure to ultraviolet radiation. Its surface is homogeneous in color and spectrum; this may be because Sedna, unlike objects nearer the Sun, is rarely impacted by other bodies, which would expose bright patches of fresh icy material like that on 8405 Asbolus. Sedna and two other very distant objects –  and  – share their color with outer classical Kuiper belt objects and the centaur 5145 Pholus, suggesting a similar region of origin.

Trujillo and colleagues have placed upper limits on Sedna's surface composition of 60% for methane ice and 70% for water ice. The presence of methane further supports the existence of tholins on Sedna's surface, because they are produced by irradiation of methane. Barucci and colleagues compared Sedna's spectrum with that of Triton and detected weak absorption bands belonging to methane and nitrogen ices. From these observations, they suggested the following model of the surface: 24% Triton-type tholins, 7% amorphous carbon, 10% nitrogen ices, 26% methanol, and 33% methane. The detection of methane and water ices was confirmed in 2006 by the Spitzer Space Telescope mid-infrared photometry. The European Southern Observatory's Very Large Telescope observed Sedna with the SINFONI near-infrared spectrometer, finding indications of tholins and water ice on the surface.

The presence of nitrogen on the surface suggests the possibility that, at least for a short time, Sedna may have a tenuous atmosphere. During a 200-year period near perihelion, the maximum temperature on Sedna should exceed , the transition temperature between alpha-phase solid N2 and the beta-phase seen on Triton. At 38 K, the N2 vapor pressure would be 14 microbar (1.4 Pa or 0.000014 atm). Its deep red spectral slope is indicative of high concentrations of organic material on its surface, and its weak methane absorption bands indicate that methane on Sedna's surface is ancient, rather than freshly deposited. This means that Sedna is too cold for methane to evaporate from its surface and then fall back as snow, which happens on Triton and probably on Pluto.

Origin 
In their paper announcing the discovery of Sedna, Brown and his colleagues described it as the first observed body belonging to the Oort cloud, the hypothetical cloud of comets thought to exist nearly a light-year from the Sun. They observed that, unlike scattered disc objects such as Eris, Sedna's perihelion (76 AU) is too distant for it to have been scattered by the gravitational influence of Neptune. Because it is considerably closer to the Sun than was expected for an Oort cloud object, and has an inclination roughly in line with the planets and the Kuiper belt, they described the planetoid as being an "inner Oort cloud object", situated in the disc reaching from the Kuiper belt to the spherical part of the cloud.

If Sedna formed in its current location, the Sun's original protoplanetary disc must have extended as far as 75 AU into space. Also, Sedna's initial orbit must have been approximately circular, otherwise its formation by the accretion of smaller bodies into a whole would not have been possible, because the large relative velocities between planetesimals would have been too disruptive. Therefore, it must have been tugged into its current eccentric orbit by a gravitational interaction with another body. In their initial paper, Brown, Rabinowitz and colleagues suggested three possible candidates for the perturbing body: an unseen planet beyond the Kuiper belt, a single passing star, or one of the young stars embedded with the Sun in the stellar cluster in which it formed.

Brown and his team favored the hypothesis that Sedna was lifted into its current orbit by a star from the Sun's birth cluster, arguing that Sedna's aphelion of about 1,000 AU, which is relatively close compared to those of long-period comets, is not distant enough to be affected by passing stars at their current distances from the Sun. They propose that Sedna's orbit is best explained by the Sun having formed in an open cluster of several stars that gradually disassociated over time. That hypothesis has also been advanced by both Alessandro Morbidelli and Scott Jay Kenyon. Computer simulations by Julio A. Fernandez and Adrian Brunini suggest that multiple close passes by young stars in such a cluster would pull many objects into Sedna-like orbits. A study by Morbidelli and Levison suggested that the most likely explanation for Sedna's orbit was that it had been perturbed by a close (approximately 800 AU) pass by another star in the first 100 million years or so of the Solar System's existence.

The trans-Neptunian planet hypothesis has been advanced in several forms by a number of astronomers, including Rodney Gomes and Patryk Lykawka. One scenario involves perturbations of Sedna's orbit by a hypothetical planetary-sized body in the inner Oort cloud. In 2006, simulations suggested that Sedna's orbital traits could be explained by perturbations by a Neptune-mass object at 2,000 AU (or less), a Jupiter-mass object at 5,000 AU, or even an Earth-mass object at 1,000 AU. Computer simulations by Patryk Lykawka have indicated that Sedna's orbit may have been caused by a body roughly the size of Earth, ejected outward by Neptune early in the Solar System's formation and currently in an elongated orbit between 80 and 170 AU from the Sun. Brown's various sky surveys have not detected any Earth-sized objects out to a distance of about 100 AU. It is possible that such an object may have been scattered out of the Solar System after the formation of the inner Oort cloud.

Caltech researchers Konstantin Batygin and Brown have hypothesized the existence of a super-Earth planet in the outer Solar System, Planet Nine, to explain the orbits of a group of extreme trans-Neptunian objects that includes Sedna. This planet would be perhaps 6 times as massive as Earth. It would have a highly eccentric orbit, and its average distance from the Sun would be about 15 times that of Neptune (which orbits at an average distance of ). Accordingly, its orbital period would be approximately 7,000 to 15,000 years.

Morbidelli and Kenyon have suggested that Sedna did not originate in the Solar System, but was captured by the Sun from a passing extrasolar planetary system, specifically that of a brown dwarf about 1/20th the mass of the Sun or a main-sequence star 80 percent more massive than the Sun, which, owing to its larger mass, may now be a white dwarf. In either case, the stellar encounter had likely occurred within 100 million years after the Sun's formation. Stellar encounters during this time would have minimal effect on the Oort cloud's final mass and population since the Sun had excess material for replenishing the Oort cloud.

Population 

Sedna's highly elliptical orbit means that the probability of its detection was roughly 1 in 80, which suggests that, unless its discovery was a fluke, another 40–120 Sedna-sized objects would exist within the same region.

In 2007, astronomer Megan Schwamb outlined how each of the proposed mechanisms for Sedna's extreme orbit would affect the structure and dynamics of any wider population. If a trans-Neptunian planet was responsible, all such objects would share roughly the same perihelion (about 80 AU). If Sedna were captured from another planetary system that rotated in the same direction as the Solar System, then all of its population would have orbits on relatively low inclinations and have semi-major axes ranging from 100 to 500 AU. If it rotated in the opposite direction, then two populations would form, one with low and one with high inclinations. The perturbations from passing stars would produce a wide variety of perihelia and inclinations, each dependent on the number and angle of such encounters.

A larger sample of objects with Sedna's extreme perihelion may help in determining which scenario is most likely. "I call Sedna a fossil record of the earliest Solar System", said Brown in 2006. "Eventually, when other fossil records are found, Sedna will help tell us how the Sun formed and the number of stars that were close to the Sun when it formed." A 2007–2008 survey by Brown, Rabinowitz and Megan Schwamb attempted to locate another member of Sedna's hypothetical population. Although the survey was sensitive to movement out to 1,000 AU and discovered the likely dwarf planet Gonggong, it detected no new sednoid. Subsequent simulations incorporating the new data suggested about 40 Sedna-sized objects probably exist in this region, with the brightest being about Eris's magnitude (−1.0).

Another high-perihelion trans-Neptunian object was announced by Sheppard and colleagues in 2018, provisionally designated  and now named Leleākūhonua.

Sedna was recovered from Transiting Exoplanet Survey Satellite data in 2020, as part of preliminary work for an all-sky survey searching for Planet Nine and other as-yet-unknown trans-Neptunian objects.

Classification 
The discovery of Sedna resurrected the question of which astronomical objects should be considered planets and which should not. On 15 March 2004, articles on Sedna in the popular press reported that a tenth planet had been discovered. This question was resolved for many astronomers by the International Astronomical Union definition of a planet, adopted on 24 August 2006, which mandated that a planet must have cleared the neighborhood around its orbit. Sedna is not expected to have cleared its neighborhood; quantitatively speaking, its Stern–Levison parameter is estimated to be much less than 1. The IAU also adopted dwarf planet as a term for the largest non-planets (despite the name), that like planets are in hydrostatic equilibrium and thus can display planet-like geological activity, but have not cleared their neighbourhoods. Sedna is bright enough, and therefore large enough, that it is expected to be in hydrostatic equilibrium. Hence, astronomers generally consider Sedna a dwarf planet.

Beside its physical classification, Sedna is categorised according to its orbit. The Minor Planet Center, which officially catalogs the objects in the Solar System, designates Sedna only as a trans-Neptunian object (as it orbits beyond Neptune), as does the JPL Small-Body Database.

Exploration 
Sedna will come to perihelion around July 2076. This close approach to the Sun provides an opportunity for study that will not occur again for 12,000 years. Because Sedna spends much of its orbit beyond the heliopause, the point at which the solar wind gives way to the interstellar medium, examining Sedna's surface would provide unique information on the effects of interstellar radiation, as well as the properties of the solar wind at its farthest extent. It was calculated in 2011 that a flyby mission to Sedna could take 24.48 years using a Jupiter gravity assist, based on launch dates of 6 May 2033 or 23 June 2046. Sedna would be 77.27 or 76.43 AU from the Sun when the spacecraft arrived near the end of 2057 or 2070, respectively. Other potential flight trajectories involve gravity assists from Venus, Earth, Saturn, and Neptune as well as Jupiter.

Notes

References

Further reading

External links 

 NASA's Sedna page (Discovery Photos)
 Mike Brown's Sedna page
 

Sednoids
Extreme trans-Neptunian objects
Inner Oort cloud
Sedna
Sedna
20031114
Sedna
Sedna
Sedna